East Brooklyn is a census-designated place located within the town of Brooklyn in Windham County, Connecticut. It is the portion of the Danielson urban cluster within the town of Brooklyn. The population was 1,638 at the 2010 census. US 6 runs through the town and severs the town.

The portion of the CDP near the Quinebaug River is known as the Quinebaug Mill-Quebec Square Historic District.

Geography
According to the United States Census Bureau, the CDP has a total area of 4.3 km2 (1.6 mi2).  4.2 km2 (1.6 mi2) of it is land and 0.1 km2 (0.04 mi2) of it (1.21%) is water.

Demographics
As of the census of 2000, there were 1,473 people, 668 households, and 378 families residing in the CDP.  The population density was 348.9/km2 (903.8/mi2).  There were 690 housing units at an average density of 163.4/km2 (423.4/mi2).  The racial makeup of the CDP was 94.30% White, 2.04% African American, 0.81% Native American, 0.75% Asian, 0.41% from other races, and 1.70% from two or more races. Hispanic or Latino of any race were 1.83% of the population.

There were 668 households, out of which 28.1% had children under the age of 18 living with them, 35.8% were married couples living together, 15.9% had a female householder with no husband present, and 43.4% were non-families. 37.7% of all households were made up of individuals, and 20.4% had someone living alone who was 65 years of age or older.  The average household size was 2.21 and the average family size was 2.87.

In the CDP, the population was spread out, with 25.2% under the age of 18, 7.9% from 18 to 24, 28.4% from 25 to 44, 19.3% from 45 to 64, and 19.2% who were 65 years of age or older.  The median age was 38 years. For every 100 females, there were 85.8 males.  For every 100 females age 18 and over, there were 77.5 males.

The median income for a household in the CDP was $25,813, and the median income for a family was $34,265. Males had a median income of $27,500 versus $23,182 for females. The per capita income for the CDP was $15,093.  About 11.3% of families and 15.5% of the population were below the poverty line, including 18.0% of those under age 18 and 6.5% of those age 65 or over.

References

Brooklyn, Connecticut
Census-designated places in Windham County, Connecticut
Census-designated places in Connecticut